This is the list of Important Bird Areas in Michigan, the status of which is officially recognized.
  
 Allegan State Game Area
 Au Sable State Forest
 Cross Village Township, Michigan
 Detroit River International Wildlife Refuge
 Fort Custer Recreation Area
 Fort Custer Training Center
 Harsens Island
 Huron-Manistee National Forests
 Lake Erie Metropark
 Ludington State Park
 Pointe Mouillee State Game Area
 Saginaw Bay
 Seney National Wildlife Refuge
 Sleeping Bear Dunes National Lakeshore
 St. Joseph River (Lake Michigan)
 Tawas Point State Park
 Waterloo Recreation Area
 Whitefish Point Light
 Wilderness State Park
 Yankee Springs Recreation Area

References

Important Bird Areas of Michigan
Important Bird Areas